Warhammer: Battle for Atluma is a video game adaptation of the WarCry collectible card game for the PSP.

Reception

Warhammer: Battle for Atluma received "mixed or average" reviews, according to review aggregator Metacritic.

IGN found problems with the game's severely minimalistic presentation that "...[didn't] use the power of the PSP at all" and called the title "...a very bare-bones experience." GameSpot praised the solid translation of the Warhammer Warcry game mechanics while criticizing the dull presentation, hard-to-read cards, and lack of sorting and filtering options available for the player's deck. GameSpy called the CCG mechanics decent and panned the weak single-player campaign mode and bad presentation. GameZone gave the game 5 out of 10 and wrote, "Battle for Atluma is a good package for any lover of the card game, but it doesn’t offer anything special to draw outsiders into the experience." GamesRadar+ cited the accessibility, custom decks, and campaign mode as positives while taking issue with the lack of Warhammer aesthetics, simplistic gameplay, and card text readability issues.

References

2006 video games
JV Games games
North America-exclusive video games
Digital collectible card games
PlayStation Portable games
PlayStation Portable-only games
Video games developed in the United Kingdom
Warhammer Fantasy video games